General Pershing: (one – step, march or two – step) is a march composed in 1918 by Carl D. Vandersloot and published by Vandersloot Music Publishing Company.

The song honors John J. Pershing, who led the American Expeditionary Forces to victory over Germany in World War I, 1917–18.

References 

Bibliography
Paas, John Roger. America Sings of War: American Sheet Music from World War I. Wiesbaden: Harrassowitz Vertag, 2014.  
Parker, Bernard S. World War I Sheet Music: 9,670 Patriotic Songs Published in the United States, 1914-1920, with More Than 600 Covers Illustrated. Jefferson, N.C.: McFarland, 2007.  
Vogel, Frederick G. World War I Songs: A History and Dictionary of Popular American Patriotic Tunes, with Over 300 Complete Lyrics. Jefferson: McFarland & Company, Inc., 1995. . 

Songs of World War I
Songs about military officers
1918 songs